or Natural Habitat Protection Areas in Japan are designated by the Ministry of the Environment to protect species of flora and fauna designated National Endangered Species, in accordance with the 1992 Act on Conservation of Endangered Species of Wild Fauna and Flora. Both managed protection zones and buffer monitoring zones are established.

Designated Natural Habitat Conservation Areas
As of March 2018, nine Natural Habitat Conservation Areas have been designated.

Complementary measures
Natural Habitat Conservation Areas are one element in a network of complementary protected area systems. Others include Wilderness Areas and Nature Conservation Areas under the Nature Conservation Law; Natural Parks under the Natural Parks Law; Wildlife Protection Areas under the Wildlife Protection and Hunting Law; Natural Monuments and Special Natural Monuments under the Law for the Protection of Cultural Properties 1950; Protected Forests under the National Forest Management Bylaw; and Protected Water Surfaces under the Preservation of Fisheries Resources Law.

See also
 Wildlife of Japan
 National Parks of Japan
 Wildlife Protection Areas in Japan
 Environmental issues in Japan

References

External links
 Protected areas in Japan (Ministry of the Environment)
 Nature Conservation in Japan (Ministry of the Environment)
  List of Natural Habitat Conservation Areas (Ministry of the Environment)

Protected areas of Japan